Project MKOFTEN was a covert U.S. Department of Defense program developed in conjunction with the Central Intelligence Agency (CIA) sometime in the late 1960s. A partner or descendant program of MKSEARCH, the goal of MKOFTEN was to "test the behavioral and toxicological effects of certain drugs on animals and humans". Testing of these drugs was done on animals, prisoners at Holmesburg Prison in Philadelphia, and military personnel at Edgewood Arsenal.

See also
Stargate Project
Project ARTICHOKE
Project MKULTRA

References

Central Intelligence Agency operations
American medical research
MKOFTEN
Mkoften